Eric Berger is an American media executive. He co-founded and is currently the Chief executive officer of Common Sense Media.

Career 
Berger joined Time Warner as a corporate vice president of strategic planning where he was responsible for wireless initiatives and the creation of business growth. In 2006, Berger joined Sony Pictures as a vice president of mobile entertainment and digital networks, running the mobile publishing and distribution business. In May 2008, he became the general manager of Crackle (formerly known as Grouper), Sony's ad-supported video streaming service. He led the development, production, and distribution of original programming, among which the Emmy-nominated show, Comedians in Cars Getting Coffee, is included.

In 2017, Berger was named Chief Digital Officer for Sony Pictures Television Networks, and in 2018, he became the head of Sony's Direct-To-Consumer Unit, which included oversight of Funimation, Crackle, Film1 OTT and Animax.

In 2020, Berger joined Common Sense Media, and after a year of joining, he launched the parent company Sensical TV. Sensical provides a free streaming service for kids ages 2 to 10.

Recognition 
In 2015, Berger was named one of Variety’s 30 Digital Entertainment Execs to Watch. In 2016, Berger was named in the Hollywood Reporter's Silicon Beach 25: LA's Most Powerful Digital Players list.

References 

Year of birth missing (living people)
Living people
American media executives
Sony Pictures Television employees